Lindsay Davenport and Jana Novotná were the defending champions but they competed with different partners that year, Davenport with Natasha Zvereva and Novotná with Chanda Rubin.

Novotná and Rubin lost in the quarterfinals to Lisa Raymond and Rennae Stubbs.

Davenport and Zvereva won in the final 6–3, 6–0 against Alexandra Fusai and Nathalie Tauziat.

Seeds
Champion seeds are indicated in bold text while text in italics indicates the round in which those seeds were eliminated. The top four seeded teams received byes into the second round.

Draw

Final

Top half

Bottom half

External links
 1998 WTA German Open Doubles Draw

WTA German Open
1998 WTA Tour